This article lists the prime ministers of Israel since the adoption of the Israeli Declaration of Independence in 1948.

Prime ministers of Israel (1948–present)
Fourteen people have served as prime minister of Israel, five of whom have served on two or three non-consecutive occasions. Additionally, one person, Yigal Allon, has served solely as an acting prime minister. The other two who have served as acting prime minister have gone on to become the prime minister.

Notes
 For the 1965 elections, Mapai allied with Ahdut HaAvoda to form the Labor Alignment, later renamed Alignment. This first Alignment ended when Mapai, Ahdut HaAvoda and Rafi merged to form the Labor Party on 23 January 1968. On 28 January 1969, Labor formed a second Alignment in alliance with Mapam.

 Eshkol died while in office. Yigal Allon briefly served as Acting Prime Minister until he was replaced by Meir.

 Rabin resigned and called for early elections in December 1976. After he was re-elected as the Alignment's leader, he resigned as candidate for the upcoming elections on 7 April 1977, but legally remained Prime Minister until Begin's first government was formed. However, Shimon Peres unofficially served as Acting Prime Minister from 22 April 1977 until 21 June 1977.

 Until 1988, Likud was simply an electoral alliance between Herut and the Liberal Party, much like Alignment. A single united Likud party was only established in 1988.

 After the 1984 elections, Likud and the Alignment reached a coalition agreement by which the role of Prime Minister would be rotated mid-term between them. Shimon Peres of the Alignment served as Prime Minister for the first two years, and then the role was passed to Yitzhak Shamir. After the 1988 election Likud was able to govern without the Alignment, and Yitzhak Shamir continued as Prime Minister.

 Rabin was assassinated while in office. Shimon Peres served as Acting Prime Minister until 22 November 1995.

 On 21 November 2005, Prime Minister Sharon, along with several other ministers and MKs, split from Likud over the issue of disengagement from the Gaza Strip and negotiations over the final status of the West Bank. Sharon formed a new party, Kadima, which would go on to compete in the following elections of March 2006. Sharon continued as Prime Minister.

 As the result of Ariel Sharon suffering a severe stroke on 4 January 2006, and being put under general anesthetic, Ehud Olmert served as the Acting Prime Minister from 4 January to 14 April, according to Basic Law: The Government: "Should the Prime Minister be temporarily unable to discharge his duties, his place will be filled by the Acting Prime Minister. After the passage of 100 days upon which the Prime Minister does not resume his duties, the Prime Minister will be deemed permanently unable to exercise his office." Basic Law: the Government 2001, section 16b In Sharon's case, this occurred on 14 April 2006, upon which Olmert became Interim Prime Minister for the remainder of the 30th government, finally becoming full Prime Minister on the formation of the 31st government.

 Olmert officially resigned on 21 September 2008. With this, his cabinet became an interim government, and he was the "Interim" Prime Minister until the establishment of a new governing coalition (he was officially the Prime Minister, however, the government under him was an interim government, in this case).

 Under the coalition agreement establishing the thirty-sixth government of Israel, Naftali Bennett's tenure as Prime Minister concluded at the end of 30 June 2022 and Yair Lapid took office at the beginning of 1 July 2022.

 The following parties were members of a government during only part of its term:
 9th: Progress and Development and Cooperation and Brotherhood, two new parties, were members of the 9th government, which was otherwise identical in composition to the 7th and 8th governments.
 13th: Gahal and Rafi joined 5 June 1967. Rafi merged into Labor (a member of the Alignment) 23 January 1968.
 15th: Gahal stood down 6 August 1970.
 17th: National Religious Party joined 30 October 1970; Ratz stood down 6 November 1970.
 18th: Democratic Movement for Change joined October 1977.
 19th: Tehiya joined 26 August 1981; the Movement for the Renewal of Social Zionism was formed 6 June 1983 following the break-up of Telem.
 22nd: Morasha was not included in the 22nd government, which was otherwise identical in composition to the 21st government.
 25th: Shas stood down 14 September 1993; Yiud joined 9 January 1995.
 28th: United Torah Judaism stood down September 1999.
 29th: Shas stood down 23 May 2002, returned 3 June; Labor-Meimad stood down 2 November 2002.
 30th: National Religious Party joined 3 March 2003, stood down 11 November 2004; National Union stood down 6 June 2004; Shinui stood down 4 December 2004; Labor-Meimad joined 10 January 2005; Agudat Yisrael joined 30 March 2005; Kadima broke away from Likud and Labor-Meimad stood down 23 November 2005, leaving a government consisting of Kadima, Likud and Agudat Yisrael; Likud stood down 15 January 2006.
 31st: Yisrael Beiteinu joined November 2006; stood down 16 January 2008.
 32nd: United Torah Judaism joined 1 April 2009; Independence broke away from Labor 17 January 2011; Independence remained in the government and Labor stood down.
 34th: Yisrael Beiteinu joined 30 May 2016; stood down 18 November 2018; New Right split from The Jewish Home on 29 December 2018 and remained in gov't until 2 June 2019, returning on 8 November 2019; Kulanu merged into Likud on 31 July 2019;The Jewish Home merged with Tkuma and Otzma Yehudit on 21 February 2019 to become the Union of Right-Wing Parties; On 15 January 2020, New Right and URWP merged to become Yamina.
 35th: Of the three Labor MKs, one (Merav Michaeli) sat in opposition; Derekh Eretz stood down 16 December 2020.

Term of office in years

 David Ben-Gurion:  13 years and 127 days (first term: 5 years and 257 days; second term: 7 years and 235 days)
 Yitzhak Shamir: 6 years and 242 days  (first term: 339 days; second term: 5 years and 268 days)
 Yitzhak Rabin: 6 years and 132 days (first term: 3 years and 18 days; second term: 3 years and 114 days)
 Menachem Begin: 6 years and 113 days
 Levi Eshkol: 5 years and 247 days
 Ariel Sharon: 5 years and 39 days 
 Golda Meir: 5 years and 19 days
 Ehud Olmert: 2 years and 351 days 
 Shimon Peres: 2 years and 264 days (first term: 2 years and 37 days; second term: 227 days)
 Moshe Sharett: 1 year and 281 days
 Ehud Barak: 1 year and 245 days
 Naftali Bennett: 1 year and 17 days
 Yair Lapid: 181 days
 Yigal Allon: 19 days (acting)

Timeline
This is a graphical lifespan timeline of prime ministers of Israel. The prime ministers are listed in order of office, with prime ministers who held the office more than once listed in order of their first term.

See also
 Prime Minister of Israel
 List of Jewish leaders in the Land of Israel
 List of presidents of Israel
 List of prime ministers of Israel by place of birth

References

External links
 The PM's Who Shaped Israel – slideshow by The First Post

Prime Ministers, List
Israeli prime ministers by time in office
Israel, Prime Minister of
Prime Ministers